General elections were held in Samoa on 9 April 2021 to determine the composition of the 17th Parliament. In March 2021, Fiamē Naomi Mataʻafa, a former member of the ruling Human Rights Protection Party (HRPP) and a former Deputy Prime Minister, was elected to lead the main opposition party, Faʻatuatua i le Atua Samoa ua Tasi (FAST). Prime minister Tuila'epa Sa'ilele Malielegaoi led the HRPP into the election.

Preliminary results showed a tie between the HRPP and FAST, with each winning 25 seats in the Legislative Assembly. This was confirmed in the final count. However, the Samoan electoral commission subsequently determined that, with women comprising 9.8 percent of the elected members, the results did not fulfil a constitutional provision which required that at least 10 percent of seats be held by women. As a result, an additional female candidate – Ali'imalemanu Alofa Tuuau of the HRPP – was declared elected, increasing the parliament's membership to 52 and the HRPP's seat total to 26. Following this, Tuala Iosefo Ponifasio, an independent member, announced that he would side with FAST, creating a hung parliament with both the HRPP and FAST holding 26 seats.

However, on 17 May 2021, the Supreme Court of Samoa overturned the decision of the electoral commission, cancelling the additional seat, and ruling against Tuila'epa's request for a new election.  This gave FAST a slim majority, allowing them to declare victory and select Mataʻafa as Samoa's first female Prime Minister.  Tuila'epa refused to accept the results and instead suspended Parliament, plunging the country into a prolonged political crisis.  Mataʻafa was sworn in by FAST MPs in an ad-hoc ceremony outside parliament, a move denounced by Tuila'epa as “treason and the highest form of illegal conduct”.

After months of legal disputes, on 23 July, the Court of Appeal ruled that FAST had won the election and Mataʻafa was now the Prime Minister.  On 26 July, Tuila'epa conceded the election, ending the crisis. On 17 August the final election petition was decided, giving a final result of FAST 26 — HRPP 18.

Background

The Human Rights Protection Party had dominated Samoan politics since 1982. The party's leader, Tuila‘epa Sa‘ilele Malielegaoi had served as prime minister since 1998 and around the time of this election was one of the longest-serving incumbent heads of government in the world. During the previous election held in 2016, the HRPP won a landslide re-election, winning 35 seats, including an extra seat established to fulfil the female parliamentary quota. The opposition Tautua Samoa Party (TSP) only won two seats down from 13 in the 2011 election, and the party's leader Palusalue Faapo II lost his seat. Many of the Independent candidates were HRPP affiliates but were not permitted to run as members of the ruling party as they were challenging HRPP incumbents. Therefore, following the election, of the 13 successful independents, 12 joined the HRPP giving the party a two-thirds majority of 47 seats. One independent joined the TSP, increasing its seat share to three. Still, because the TSP failed to win at least eight seats, it lost recognition as a parliamentary party which left Samoa without an official opposition. Palusalue Fa‘apo II ceased to be the TSP leader after his loss, and the party did not select a replacement. 

In December 2020, parliament passed three Land and Titles bills, a reform of the judicial system that would grant the land and titles court greater autonomy and would no longer be accountable to the Supreme Court and the Court of Appeals. The bills sparked criticism from the Samoa Law Society, highlighting the lack of public consultation and a bypass of the due parliamentary process. The Supreme Court justices released a statement of condemnation, arguing the bills would undermine the rule of law. One member of parliament, La‘auli Leuatea Polataivao, was expelled from the HRPP for his opposition to the bills, and went on to establish the Fa‘atuatua i le Atua Samoa ua Tasi (FAST) party. La‘auli's seat was later controversially declared vacant, but he retained it after successfully contesting a subsequent by-election in August 2020. Two other MPs of the ruling party later joined FAST, including Fiamē Naomi Mata‘afa, who resigned as deputy prime minister, and in March 2021, was elected by FAST to lead the party.

Electoral system

The 2021 elections saw 51 members of the Fono elected from single-member constituencies by first-past-the-post voting. Universal suffrage was introduced in 1990, permitting Samoan citizens over the age of 21 to vote in person. Candidates were required to be at least 21 years of age, heads of their families and resident of the country for at least three years prior the nomination date. Civil servants and people with mental illness were ineligible to stand as candidates. People convicted for bribery or an electoral offence, and people given a prison sentence of more than two years (including the death sentence), were also ineligible.

The Constitution Amendment Act 2013 ensures a minimum of 10 per cent of seats in parliament are reserved for women.

Campaign

Five parties were originally expected to contest the elections: the HRPP, FAST, the Tautua Samoa Party (TSP), the Samoa First Party, and the Samoa National Democratic Party. In May 2020 another party, the Tumua ma Puleono, registered for the elections. In July 2020, Prime Minister Tuila'epa Sa'ilele Malielegaoi confirmed that he would be competing in a record fifth election.

200 candidates were nominated for the election: After electoral challenges were heard, the number dropped to 198: 113 for the HRPP, 50 for FAST, 14 for Tautua Samoa, 5 for Samoa First, 1 for the Sovereign Independent Samoa Party, and 15 Independents. A record 21 women stood for office. Three candidates, Prime Minister Tuila'epa, FAST leader Fiamē Naomi Mata'afa, and Cabinet Minister Lealailepule Rimoni Aiafi were elected unopposed.

On 2 September 2020, the FAST party announced it would join forces with the Samoa National Democratic Party and Tumua ma Puleono parties to contest the 2021 election. SNDP and Tumua ma Puleono candidates ran under the FAST banner, with only one candidate in each constituency. In January 2021 the party began an "election roadshow", which Prime Minister Tuila'epa denounced the roadshow as a "foreign practice", and encouraged his supporters to gatecrash FAST events to counter the party's "brainwashing". On 29 January, FAST revealed that it had begun talks with the Tautua Samoa Party to form a grand coalition to oust the government. FAST MPs were frequently absent from parliament during its final sitting to campaign, resulting in threats to discipline them from the Deputy Speaker. On the final day of parliament on 3 March, Prime Minister Tuila'epa ordered a commission of inquiry to investigate the MP's absences, as well as unspecified "treasonous acts" related to campaign speeches. Following feedback from the roadshow the party formally launched its manifesto in late March, just weeks before the poll.

The HRPP began its campaign just three weeks before the election date, with a manifesto launch on 19 March. The party promised a new hospital in Salelologa as well as new standalone ministries of culture and the environment.

The Tautua Samoa Party released its manifesto in September 2020, promising increased pensions, a higher minimum wage, and an anti-corruption body. On 11 December 2020 the party announced an electoral alliance with the Samoa First Party and Sovereign Independent Samoa Party, under which the parties will support each other's candidates in seats where they are not running against one another. On 29 January 2021 the alliance launched its manifesto.

On 26 March 2021, Tuila'epa predicted that his party would win the election and that the HRPP would increase its seats in Parliament to 45.

Conduct

The election date was announced in April 2020. 

In October 2020, prime minister Tuila'epa announced that overseas absentee voting would not be permitted. He claimed that voting from abroad was vulnerable to irregularities and assured that Samoan citizens residing overseas were allowed to cast their vote so long as they travelled to Samoa to do so. The decision sparked criticism from individuals like Tui Ātua Tupua Tamasese Efi, a former head of state and prime minister. He argued that because remittances from overseas Samoans contribute significantly to the economy, citizens abroad should be permitted to vote from afar. The former head of state believed the government's refusal to entertain overseas ballots to have been politically motivated.

On 13 February 2021, the Electoral Commissioner warned village councils not to interfere with voting rights.

Parliament was dissolved on 3 March 2021, and the writ for the election was issued on 9 March 2021.

Early voting for senior citizens, disabled voters, essential workers and those travelling on election day began on 5 April, with the results published each evening. According to the electoral commission 7,414 voters cast an early vote. Pre-polling results showed the HRPP leading in 27 seats, FAST in 20, and Tautua in one. On election day polls opened at 8 am and closed at 3 pm.

39 cases of double voting were detected in the formal count of the Sagaga 2 constituency and referred to police.

Results

Final results showed FAST with 25 seats and the HRPP being reduced to 25 seats. Five women were elected. Negotiations began immediately to win over independent Tuala Iosefo Ponifasio, and on 21 April it was announced that he would join the FAST party.

By constituency

Uncontested

The following three candidates were elected unopposed:

Aftermath

28 election petitions were filed, 14 against FAST and 14 against the HRPP.

On 20 April 2021, the Samoan electoral commission declared the HRPP's Ali'imalemanu Alofa Tuuau elected due to the requirement that a minimum of 10% of seats in parliament must be held by women. The decision was challenged in court by FAST. On 21 April independent Tuala Iosefo Ponifasio announced he would join FAST, creating a 26–26 deadlock. On 23 April, the Tautua Samoa Party called for a fresh election to resolve the deadlock. On 25 April, legislative clerk Tiatia Graeme Tualaulelei said that the opening of parliament would be delayed until election petitions had been resolved. On 4 May the leaders of HRPP and FAST met with O le Ao o le Malo (Head of State) Tuimalealiifano Va'aletoa Sualauvi II to discuss the possibility of a second election to break the deadlock. The FAST Party opposed new elections, saying that court cases and electoral petitions should be resolved first. On the evening of 4 May, the O le Ao o le Malo purported to dissolve Parliament and ordered new elections for 21 May. A writ for the new election was issued on 5 May 2021. The dissolution was welcomed by the Tautua Samoa Party, but denounced as unlawful by FAST, and as "unconstitutional" and a "coup".

The FAST Party began court proceedings to challenge the dissolution. The case was heard on 14 May, and a decision was made on 17 May, with a decision on Tuuau's seat delivered the same day. The challenge was successful. Electoral petitions will be heard from 24 May.

On 17 May, the Supreme Court of Samoa overturned Tuuau's appointment, giving FAST a 26–25 majority in Parliament. Shortly afterwards they overturned the voiding of election results and calling of a new election as having no legal authority. They upheld the April results and ordered parliament to meet within 45 days of the original poll. Tuilaepa said both decisions would be appealed.

On 18 May 2021, Mata'afa and representatives of the FAST Party met with the O le Ao o le Malo to confirm they had the support of 26 MPs and deliver the names of their nominees for Speaker and Deputy Speaker. Tuilaepa said that his caretaker government would remain in power until all election-related court cases are resolved.

On 19 May, the O le Ao o le Malo agreed to convene the new Parliament. On 21 May, the Court of Appeal of Samoa declined to stay the Supreme Court's ruling over Tuuau's appointment, confirming FAST's parliamentary majority. Immediately after the ruling, the O le Ao o le Malo issued a proclamation convening the opening of the new Parliament on 24 May. That same day, an attempt by the Attorney-General to have the writ overturned was rejected by the Supreme Court. In doing so, the Court ruled that "the ruling of the Supreme Court represents the law in Samoa, and it should be followed. Failure to abide by the law has its own consequences".

On 22 May 2021, the O le Ao o le Malo suspended the proclamation until further notice and did not elaborate on the reasons behind the suspension but that the said reasons will be known in 'due course', triggering the 2021 Samoan constitutional crisis. Mataʻafa denounced the suspension as a coup, and announced plans to challenge it in court. On 23 May the Supreme Court met in chambers to hear a motion to overturn the suspension. That afternoon, they ruled the decision was unlawful and that the proclamation convening parliament for 24 May continued to stand. Tuilaepa responded by saying that the court order was illegal, that the judges had breached State of Emergency regulations and ought to be charged, and that he and members of the HRPP would refuse to be sworn in when parliament convened. Later that evening, Speaker of the House Leaupepe Toleafoa Faafisi purported to cancel the swearing-in ceremony, in contravention of the court's order.

On the morning of 24 May, FAST MPs and supporters arrived at Parliament to find police surrounding the building and the doors locked. The Clerk of Parliament refused them entry, in obedience to Faafisi's order. Mata’afa said that MPs would wait for the head of state, and convene parliament on the front steps if necessary. Later that afternoon FAST Party MPs and Ministers were sworn in within a tent outside parliament. Tuilaepa responded by accusing the FAST Party of "treason". That evening, the Federated States of Micronesia became the first government to recognise the new government and Naomi Mata’afa as the legitimate Prime Minister. This was followed by Palau which on 27 May, became the second foreign government to recognise the legitimacy of Mata’afa's administration.

On 25 May the HRPP launched a private prosecution against Mata’afa and three other FAST MPs for alleged bribery and treating. The cases will be heard in September to November 2021.  A separate private prosecution against Mata’afa over her swearing in was also launched.

On 2 June 2021 the Court of Appeal ruled that the purpose of the clause meant that the number of female MPs should be rounded up to 6, but upheld the Supreme Court's ruling that Tuuau's appointment was unconstitutional and void, on the basis that the quota should be applied not on final results, but after all election petitions and by-elections had been resolved.

On 18 June the election of the HRPP's Seiuli Ueligitone Seiuli was overturned by an election petition, which found him guilty of bribery and treating and banned him from office for 15 years. On 29 June 2021 a second HRPP MP, Tuisa Tasi Patea, resigned to avoid an election petition. On 5 July Fiugalu Eteuati Eteuati, HRPP MP for the Aleipata Itupa i Lalo constituency, was convicted of 13 counts of bribery and treating in an electoral petition. On 7 July 2021 Safata No. 2 MP Nonu Lose Niumata resigned as part of the settlement of an electoral petition. On 9 July HRPP MP Leota Tima Leavai resigned and agreed not to run in a by-election as part of an election petition settlement. On 12 July 2021 Sagaga le Falefa MP Keneti Sio, Safata No. 1 MP Leaana Ronnie Posini, and Aana Alofi No. 2 MP Aiono Afaese Toleafoa all resigned to settle election petitions, with Toleafoa also agreeing not to contest the resulting byelection. This leaves FAST with 26 seats and the HRPP with 17. On 13 July Toleafoa changed his mind, and his petition will now proceed to trial.

On 23 July 2021 the Court of Appeal delivered its judgement on the swearing-in ceremony, declaring that it was constitutional and binding, that FAST had been the government since 24 May, and that the HRPP had been unlawfully occupying office since that date.

On 16 August 2021 the election of Aana Alofi No.2 MP Aiono Afaese Toleafoa and Falealili No. 2 MP Fuimaono Teo Samuelu were both overturned by election petitions.

The final election petition was determined on 17 August, with Keneti Sio retaining his seat. This gave a final result after petitions of FAST 26 — HRPP 18.

The first meeting of the Legislative Assembly was scheduled for 14 September 2021. In the leadup to the sitting, Speaker Papali’i Li’o Taeu Masipau banned HRPP members from attending after they refused to be sworn in by him. Threats against political leaders, including FAST Deputy Leader Laauli Leuatea Polataivao, saw the parliamentary precinct locked down, public access prohibited, and the courts closed. HRPP MPs were forbidden entry on both 14 and 15 September, and on 15 September the police threatened to disperse them by force. On 16 September 2021 the Supreme Court declared that the speaker has an obligation to administer the oath of allegiance, and ordered him to swear in the HRPP MPs. The MPs were sworn in on 17 September.

On 12 October Speaker of the House Papali’i Li’o Taeu Masipau ruled that a "corrupt arrangement" of resigning to avoid an electoral petition did not disqualify a candidate from contesting a subsequent by-election, and called seven by-elections for 12 November 2021.

The 2021 Samoan by-elections on 26 November resulted in the FAST Party winning four seats and the HRPP two. One FAST MP was elected unopposed after their sole by-election opponent was declared ineligible by the Supreme Court. As no women were elected in the by-elections, the two highest-polling women across the election and by-elections were appointed under the women's quota. Both were from the HRPP, giving a total of 53 seats in parliament and a final seat tally of FAST 31, HRPP 22.

See also
List of members of the Legislative Assembly of Samoa (2021–2026)
2021 Samoan constitutional crisis

References

Samoa
2021 in Samoa
2021 04
Election and referendum articles with incomplete results